Lancieux (Gallo: Lansioec) is a commune in the Côtes-d'Armor department of Brittany in northwestern France.

Toponymy
Lancieux derives its name from the Breton lann ("hermitage") and Seoc, Cieux, or Sieu, a monk who came from British Cornwall at the end of the 6th century AD; therefore it can be translated as "the hermitage of Seoc".

Population

Inhabitants of Lancieux are called lancieutins or lancieutains in French.

Personalities
The British-Canadian poet and writer Robert W. Service, known as the "Bard of the Yukon", used to spend summers in Lancieux from 1913 until his death in 1958. He had a deep affection for the town and its scenic seaside. On many occasions, he made monetary gifts to the town, including for the school and the war memorial. Service is buried in the town cemetery.

The town of Lancieux has paid homage to the memory of Robert W. Service. One of its streets has been called Robert Service Street. A few years later, on May 18, 2002 the school of Lancieux took the name of "École Robert W. Service". Since 2000, Lancieux and Whitehorse, Yukon are sister cities.

See also
Communes of the Côtes-d'Armor department

References

External links

Official website 

Communes of Côtes-d'Armor
Côtes-d'Armor communes articles needing translation from French Wikipedia